Dubh Essa Níc Eidhin, Queen of Moylurg, died 1187. 

Dubh Essa was a daughter of an otherwise unknown Ruaidhri Ua hEidhin of Aidhne She was wife to King Conchobar Mac Diarmata. 

The Annals of Loch Ce, sub anno 1187, state:

 The Rock of Loch-Cé was burned at mid-day, where a great many people were drowned and burned, along with the daughter of O'hEidhin, i.e. Duibhessa, daughter of Ruaidhri O'hEidhin, wife of Conchobhar Mac Diarmada, king of Magh-Luirg.

See also

 Dubh Essa
 Kings of Uí Fiachrach Aidhne
 Kings of Magh Luirg

External links
 http://medievalscotland.org/kmo/AnnalsIndex/Feminine/DubEssa.shtml
 http://www.ucc.ie/celt/published/T100010A/index.html

Medieval Gaels from Ireland
12th-century Irish people
People from County Galway
People from County Roscommon
12th-century Irish women
1187 deaths
Irish royal consorts
Year of birth unknown